Chaya  was a brand of tequila produced by Interco Brands Inc The product was produced from 100% Blue Agave.

History
Chaya tequila was the brain child of Albert Berentsen, former president of Kahlúa S.A.  It was manufactured from 100% Blue Agave at Industrializadora de Agave San Isidro. Unlike many tequila brands manufactured at the Industrializadora de Agave San Isidro production facility, Chaya was never wood barrel aged. Some reviews state this may preserve more of the natural fruity flavor of the Blue Agave plant.  It was the first tequila to be included in gift bags at the MTV Movie Awards in 2006.

Awards
2005 Exceptional Spirits Award - Beverage Tasting Institute 
2005 Gold Medal - Chicago Testing Institute 
2005-2006 Golden Icon Award - Travolta Family Entertainment 
2006-2007 Golden Icon Award - Travolta Family Entertainment 
2007-2008 Golden Icon Award - Travolta Family Entertainment

References

Tequila